Petru Șchiopu (28 April 1947 - 10 October 2014) was a Romanian football midfielder.

Honours
UTA Arad
Divizia A: 1968–69, 1969–70
Divizia B: 1980–81
Bihor Oradea
Divizia B: 1970–71
Corvinul Hunedoara
Divizia B: 1975–76

References

External links
Petru Șchiopu at Labtof.ro

1947 births
2014 deaths
Romanian footballers
Association football midfielders
Liga I players
Liga II players
FC UTA Arad players
FC Bihor Oradea players
CSM Deva players
CS Corvinul Hunedoara players